Harrigan's File is a collection of stories by American writer August Derleth.  It was released in 1975 by Arkham House in an edition of 4,102 copies.  The book collects all of Derleth's science fiction.  The stories are about newspaper reporter Tex Harrigan.

Contents

Harrigan's File contains the following tales:

 "McIlvaine's Star"
 "A Corner for Lucia"
 "Invaders from the Microcosm"
 "Mary VII"
 "The Other Side of the Wall"
 "An Eye for History"
 "The Maugham Obsession"
 "A Traveler in Time"
 "The Detective and the Senator"
 "Protoplasma"
 "The Mechanical House"
 "By Rocket to the Moon"
 "The Man Who Rode the Saucer"
 "Ferguson's Capsules"
 "The Penfield Misadventure"
 "The Remarkable Dingdong"
 "The Martian Artifact"

Sources

1975 short story collections
Science fiction short story collections by August Derleth
Horror short story collections
Fantasy short story collections
Arkham House books
Books by August Derleth